White Fang (Italian: Zanna Bianca) is a 1973 Italian Northern adventure film directed by Lucio Fulci. It was produced by Harry Alan Towers and co-written by Roberto Gianviti, based on Jack London's 1906 novel White Fang. It starred Franco Nero, Fernando Rey and Virna Lisi. The film gained a great commercial success and generated an official and several non-official sequels.

Plot
Set in the year 1896 in the Yukon Wilderness, the film opens when Charlie (Daniel Martin) an Aboriginal Canadian fur trader, discovers his young son Mitsah (Missaele) attempting to befriend a wolf, he scares the beast away, believing it to be too wild and dangerous. Unknown to him, his son persists. Mitsah names the animal White Fang because of the ivory-white teeth the beast sprouts. That night, Charlie changes his mind about the animal when it arrives at his hut barking furiously. Mitsah, while strolling through the woods at night to meet his friend, falls through the thin ice of a frozen lake and the animal, a wolf/dog cross breed, raises the alarm.

Mitsah is saved by his father and canine friend, but falls seriously ill with hypothermia after his plunge into the icy water. Charlie decides to take his son for medical treatment at the nearest settlement. While carrying Mitsah down a mountainside, he meets an old friend named Kurt Johnson (Raimund Harmsdorf) a fellow fur trapper who agrees to help Charlie carry the barely conscious Mitsah. Kurt tells them the nearest town is a place called Dawson City, in which he informs them that it is not safe there. But Charlie tells them that he must get medical attention to his son or he will die. The group, after arriving at a riverside port below the snow line, are introduced to Jason Scott (Franco Nero), a writer traveling to Dawson City in search of a story. Once they arrive in town on a riverboat steamer, they meet with Sister Evangeline (Virna Lisi) a middle-aged nun who has recently arrived in Dawson City to set up a hospital mission. Jason and Kurt soon discover that Dawson City is a hotbed to business corruption and barely suppressed lawlessness. Sister Evangeline has already encountered corruption in the form of the town's alcoholic priest Father Oatley (Fernando Rey), whose interest in her money is highly suspect. Father Oatley is under the thumb of Dawson City's richest and most powerful resident, Beauty Smith (John Steiner). Smith has bought his way into overall control of the settlement, with some cash and many promissory notes he gives to the residents in exchange for gold. He surrounds himself with a posse of thugs wherever he goes and lords it up around town like a dandified artisto. Smith is also romantically involved with Father Oatley's attractive daughter Krista (Carole Andre), who works as a singer and dancer in Dawson City's notorious bar while her father conceals his paternity connection to her in shame.

Sister Evangelina takes care of the sick Mitsah at the hut she plans to turn into a hospital, while outside, Scott, Kurt, and Charlie are threatened by Hall (Rick Battaglia) one of Beauty Smith's henchmen plus a few others, demanding money for keeping Mitsah in town as well as for the hospital sign they put up. Scott and Kurt beat up Hall and all of Beauty Smith's henchmen single-handedly, which Smith himself watches with both anger and admiration for their courage.

A little later, Charlie is threatened by Smith's henchman who make racial slurs as him as well as demand money as well as the fur pelts that he brought with him. A fight is provoked by between White Fang and Smith's champion hound he uses for dogfight gambling bets. White Fang is victorious, killing the opposing dog. Beauty Smith, seeing the whole thing, approaches Charlie and offers the Indian trader a large sum of money for his dog. Charlie refuses to sell White Fang. Furious at this one humiliating failure of his attempt to wield cash power, Smith stalks off for a muttered conference with his lackeys. As Smith walks away, Charlie is surrounded by the jostling gang and fatally stabbed to death. Scott and Kurt arrive on the scene just as Smith's henchmen disperse where the assembled townspeople, gripped with fear of retribution, claim to have seen nothing.

White Fang is captured by Smith's henchmen and put to service, earning money in a public fight against a captured, wild bear chained to a post. White Fang is severely injured before Scott and Sister Evangelina arrive to rescue him. Returning the wolf-dog to Mitsah, who is starting to recover, they suppress any news of the death of his father until he is physically recovered. In the meantime, Scott takes a parental interest to the youngster.

Soon, everything starts to go wrong for Beauty Smith when he tries to persuade Krista to accompany him away from Dawson City for he is planning to skip town with his ill-gotten money, trailing unpaid promissory notes behind him. A frantic tussle erupts where Smith accidentally shoots Krista, killing her. Father Oatley, arrives on the scene and sees what Smith has done. Enraged, Oatley runs out onto the streets shouting Smith's secret to the startled townsfolk. Smith immediately decides to start packing to move onto Nome, Alaska where more gold has recently been discovered and set up shop there. Oatley's outburst blows the lid off the secret as the whole town prepares to move on to the newly discovered gold deposits.

Meanwhile, Chester (Daniele Dublino), the Smith assassin who murdered Charlie, is freed from his jail cell by a corrupt Mountie (Janos Bartha). On Smith's orders, Chester sneaks into Jason Scott's quarters and almost succeeds in killing him. But White Fang leaps in through a window and savages Chester. Beauty Smith and his lead henchmen, Hall, then sneak into the mission hut and take Mitsah hostage, and shoots Father Oatley dead as he attempts to stop them. Scott, White Fang, and a horde or irate villagers give chase. Smith attempts to sweep away his pursuers by blowing up a dam. But White Fang jumps upon Smith and saves the day by gnashing at the villain's wrist. But as Scott drags Beauty Smith back to face justice, the dynamite explodes, sweeping away Smith, Hall, and White Fang.

The following day, the remainder of the townspeople, including Scott, Kurt, Sister Evangelina, and Mitsha sail away from the abandoned town down the river in a steamboat as a tearful Mitsah is distraught over the loss of both his father and beloved hound. But at the last minute, White Fang reappears, swimming from the riverbank after the departing boat and is soon reunited with Mitsah once again.

Cast 
Franco Nero: Jason Scott
 Virna Lisi: Sister Evangelina
 Fernando Rey: Father Oatley
 John Steiner: Charles 'Beauty' Smith
 Carole André: Krista Oatley
 Raimund Harmstorf: Kurt Jansen
 Daniel Martin: Charlie
 Daniele Dublino: Chester
 John Bartha: Mountie who frees Chester
 Maurice Poli: Mountie

References

External links

1973 films
Italian adventure films
Spanish adventure films
French adventure films
1970s adventure films
Films about dogs
Films based on White Fang
Films about wolves
Films based on American novels
Films scored by Carlo Rustichelli
Northern (genre) films
1970s Italian-language films
1970s Italian films
1970s French films